Cyrus Brown "Cy" Follmer, Jr. was an American broadcaster.

Early life
Follmer was born on December 14, 1933 in Berlin, where his father was U.S. Vice Consul. He served in the United States Marine Corps during the Korean War. He later graduated from the University of Texas at Austin with a degree in broadcasting.

Broadcasting
After graduating, Follmer worked for KASE-FM in Austin, Texas. In 1961, he moved to KXYZ in Houston. In 1963, he began hosting the After Hours Show, a 2 to 3 am jazz program on KTOK in Oklahoma City. He then worked for WSVA AM, WSVA-FM, and WSVA-TV. In 1965, he left Harrisonburg to become sports director at WTVM-TV in Columbus, Georgia. He then moved to WLEX-TV in Lexington, Kentucky where he was the sports director and play-by-play announcer for Kentucky Wildcats men's basketball. In 1970, he joined WSMW-TV in Worcester, Massachusetts as sports director and play-by-play announcer for Boston Celtics and New England Patriots games. He left WSMW in 1971.

Later life
After broadcasting, Follmer worked as a stockbroker. In 1993, he was fined $50,000, required to pay $53,000 in restitution to customers, and barred from working for any National Association of Securities Dealers (NASD) member by the NASD after it found that Follmer had solicited and accepted $53,000 from customers for the purchase of securities but instead used the money for his own benefit. He later worked as a business consultant and did voice-over work.

Death
Follmer died on June 28, 2009 in Harrodsburg, Kentucky.

References

1933 births
2009 deaths
American stockbrokers
American television sports announcers
Boston Celtics announcers
College basketball announcers in the United States
National Basketball Association broadcasters
National Football League announcers
New England Patriots announcers
20th-century American Episcopalians